Witte's five-toed skink (Leptosiaphos luberoensis) is a species of lizard in the family Scincidae. It is found in the Democratic Republic of the Congo.

References

Leptosiaphos
Reptiles described in 1933
Reptiles of the Democratic Republic of the Congo
Endemic fauna of the Democratic Republic of the Congo
Taxa named by Gaston-François de Witte